The Bolivarian Revolution, and related Crisis in Venezuela, have been depicted in several films, both fiction and documentary.

In reference to Latin American, but specifically several Venezuelan, films of the 21st century, Kapur and Wagner wrote that film is "an important medium" for representations of the area and that there is "enduring importance of Latin America in the international struggle to break from neoliberalism.":113 They compare the conflicts within the Bolivarian Revolution's bases to the conflicts in Venezuelan filmmaking between the Villa del Cine and independent producers;:121 though the Villa del Cine promotes films with a feeling of "the revolutionary context of Venezuela", its process aims to mimic a Hollywood studio system, marginalizing representation and the communal nature of revolution.:122

Several writers on film also suggest that Western filmmakers are "drawn to" and document the Bolivarian Revolution and Crisis in Venezuela,:113-122 and conclude that accurate media representations of the situation in the country are important.:130 Kapur and Wagner complement some independent national filmmakers for achieving this; they have also criticized films depicting the revolution made both by the Villa del Cine, for turning stories of revolution into romanticized narratives, and internationally, for not managing to present complex full stories of the situation.:113-122

In line with the propaganda nature of national Venezuelan media, depictions of the revolution as successful are often circulated in the nation, with 2002's The Revolution Will Not Be Televised and 2004's Puente Llaguno: Claves de una Masacre still shown regularly as of 2016.:236 Comparatively, depictions of the revolution in a negative light may be censored: in 2019, the horror film Infección, in which characters claim the zombie apocalypse at the center of the narrative was caused by the revolution, was banned.

Documentaries

Fiction films

See also 
Public image of Hugo Chávez

References 

Cinema of Venezuela
Works about Hugo Chávez
Film depictions